Husam al-Din Chalabi, Ebn Akhi Tork was a Muslim Sufi and a prominent disciple of Rumi. He encouraged Rumi to create his famous work Masnavi and contributed to writing and editing the book. Rumi repeatedly praised Husam al-Din in his poetry and letters.  
 
Husam al-Din is supposed to have been born in Konya around 1225. His grandfather was a Kurdish Sufi originally from Urmia and buried in Baghdad. Some have recorded his grandfather's name as Shaykh Taj al-Din Abu al-Wafa. Husam al-Din became a disciple of Rumi in Konya. Later in 1273, after Rumi's death, he became his successor. He remained in this position until his death in 1284 when he was succeeded by Rumi's son Sultan Walad.

References 

Turkish Sufis
Kurdish Sufis
Rumi
1284 deaths
Year of birth unknown
13th-century Kurdish people
Mevlevi Order